South Detroit may refer to:

 South Detroit township, Brown County, South Dakota
 South Detroit, a hypothetical place mentioned in the song "Don't Stop Believin'
 Downriver, a suburban region southwest of Detroit, Michigan, sometimes suggested  as the location mentioned in the song
 South Detroit, Ontario, a proposed name for the city of Windsor

See also
Neighborhoods in Detroit, Michigan